This is a list of American television-related events in 1953.

Events

Television programs

Debuts

Changes of network affiliation

Ending this year

Television stations

Station launches

Network affiliation changes

Station closures

Births

See also 
1953 in television 
1953 in film 
1953 in the United States 
List of American films of 1953

References

External links 
List of 1953 American television series at IMDb